The Candela River is a river of Mexico. It is a tributary of the Rio Salado, which in turn flows into the Rio Grande.

See also
 List of rivers of Mexico
 List of tributaries of the Rio Grande

References
Atlas of Mexico, 1975 (http://www.lib.utexas.edu/maps/atlas_mexico/river_basins.jpg).
The Prentice Hall American World Atlas, 1984.
Rand McNally, The New International Atlas, 1993.

Tributaries of the Rio Grande
Rivers of Mexico